The 2014 FC Astana season was the sixth successive season that the club playing in the Kazakhstan Premier League, the highest tier of association football in Kazakhstan. Astana were crowned Kazakhstan Premier League Champions for the first time, reached the Semi-finals of the Kazakhstan Cup and the Play-off Round of the Europa League before falling to Villarreal.

Squad

Transfers

Winter

In:

Out:

Summer

In:

Out:

Competitions

Premier League

First round

Results summary

Results by round

Results

League table

Championship Round

Results summary

Results by round

Results

Table

Kazakhstan Cup

UEFA Europa League

Qualifying rounds

Squad statistics

Appearances and goals

|-
|colspan="14"|Players away from Astana on loan:

|-
|colspan="14"|Players who appeared for Astana that left during the season:

|}

Goal scorers

Clean sheets

Disciplinary record

Notes
Notes

References

FC Astana seasons
Astana
Astana